The École Supérieure des Technologies Industrielles Avancées (ESTIA), translated as "Institute of Advanced Industrial Technologies", is a French engineering and research graduate school (Grande Ecole). Founded in 1996, it is a general engineering school training trilingual versatile engineers, to undertake positions such as product engineer, supply chain planner/manager, quality manager, production manager, and project manager.

Student engineers, through their internships and projects, work closely with the local companies.

Trainings 

The school offers courses in the following disciplines: 
Digital Design & Innovation: mechanical, electronic and computer development
Electronics, Automation & Embedded systems: image processing, mobile robots, renewable energies
Industrial Management & Organisation: industrialization, global logistics, performance management

There are different qualifications available: a French engineer's degree with a Master of Science, an advanced master's degree, or a doctorate.

Postgraduate Partnerships 

The school created special partnerships with several institutes of technology worldwide to offer integrated double-degree programs to the students :

United Kingdom:
University of Salford Manchester for the MSc Robotics and Automation.
University of Wolverhampton
Cranfield University

Spain:
School of Engineering of Bilbao

Notable Teacher 
 Jean Michel Larrasket, French professor and engineer

References 

Universities in France